Pedro António Pereira Gonçalves (born 28 June 1998), known as Pedro Gonçalves or Pote, is a Portuguese professional footballer who plays as an attacking midfielder or right winger for Primeira Liga club Sporting CP and the Portugal national team.

Gonçalves started his career with Wolverhampton Wanderers, before signing for newly promoted Primeira Liga side Famalicão in 2019. Following an impressive season, in which he was named Primeira Liga's Best Young Player of the Year in 2020, Gonçalves signed for fellow Primeira Liga side Sporting CP. There, Gonçalves adapted his game from a central midfielder to an attacking midfielder, netting 23 goals in 32 league games, being awarded the Bola de Prata, helping Sporting win a double of the Primeira Liga and Taça da Liga, while also being named in the Primeira Liga's Team of the Year and the Best Young Player of the Year for the second consecutive year.

Gonçalves is a former Portugal youth international, representing his country at under-18, under-20 and under-21 levels. He made his senior international debut in 2021, being chosen in Portugal's squad for the UEFA Euro 2020.

Early life
Born in the village of Vidago, a spa town in Chaves, Vila Real District, Gonçalves' father died a month after his birth. He started his career at Vidago at the age of 8, where his mother worked as the kit provider. He was integrated into the club's youth team by vice president José Sousa, after being a regular presence around the premises. Due to being chubby and short during his childhood, he earned the nickname "Potinho" and later "Pote".

Club career

Early career
Following his performances in Vidago, Gonçalves caught the attention of his hometown club G.D. Chaves, joining the club's youth system at the age of 11. Two years later, he was taken to S.C. Braga by Jorge Pires, whose father was a friend of Pedro's father, usually travelling one hour for each training session.

After passing his trial aged 13, Gonçalves moved to the city of Braga, living in the house of a lady with two other teammates. He stayed in the youth system for five years, but left the club following the departure of his manager Agostinho Oliveira, whose contract was not renewed. Upon learning of the situation, Valencia's coach Nuno Espírito Santo offered him a professional contract, integrating him into the club's youth teams, with Pedro easily adapting to his new life in Spain and becoming club captain.

Wolverhampton Wanderers
In July 2017, Gonçalves signed a two-year contract with English club Wolverhampton Wanderers. He made his only competitive appearance for the first team on 28 August 2018, in a 2–0 away win against Sheffield Wednesday in the second round of the EFL Cup, coming on as a 62nd-minute substitute for Elliot Watt.

Famalicão
Gonçalves returned to Portugal on 2 July 2019, joining newly promoted Famalicão on a five-year deal, citing homesickness during his time in England, as one of the reasons for his transfer. He made his Primeira Liga debut on 10 August, playing the entire 2–0 victory at Santa Clara. His first goal was scored one month later, helping the hosts beat Paços de Ferreira in a 4–2 victory. During his spell at the Estádio Municipal 22 de Junho, Gonçalves established himself as a regular at midfield and made a significant contribution to the team's strong start to the season, becoming club captain in January 2020, scoring seven times and providing eight assists in all competitions from 40 appearances, helping the club to a record sixth-place finish in the league. Following his good performance for Famalicão, during the season, he was named the Primeira Liga's Best Young Player of the Year.

Sporting CP

2020–21: First Primeira Liga title and league top scorer
On 18 August 2020, Gonçalves signed a five-year contract with Sporting CP of the same league, for a fee of €6.5 million for half of his economic rights. On 1 October, he made his debut for the club in a 4–1 home loss against LASK in the play-off round of the UEFA Europa League, as a 67th-minute substitute for Luciano Vietto. With two goals in a 4–0 win over Tondela on 1 November, he reached five goals in his first six league games, second-best in the league. On 5 December, he scored and was sent off in a 2–2 draw at his previous club; this was his tenth goal over six consecutive matches.

On 15 May 2021, Gonçalves scored two goals in a 4–3 away loss against Benfica in the Derby de Lisboa, marking the first and only defeat for Sporting in the league. Four days later, he scored a hat-trick in a 5–1 home thrashing of Marítimo, taking his tally up to 23 goals, finishing as the top scorer in the league, being awarded the Bola de Prata, while also surpassing Benfica's Haris Seferovic by one goal to win the individual accolade and becoming the first national player since Domingos Paciência in 1996 to do so. On 8 July, Gonçalves was awarded the Primeira Liga's Young Player of the Year for the second consecutive year.

2021–22: Second Taça da Liga and loss in form
On 31 July, Gonçalves scored a goal in the 2–1 defeat of Braga in the Supertaça Cândido de Oliveira, and was named man of the match. From 6 August until 14 August, he scored three goals in two consecutive league matches in a 3–0 home victory over against newly promoted side Vizela, and in a 2–1 away victory against Braga, leading him to be named the Primeira Liga's Midfielder of the Month in August. At the end of the month, he injured his left foot, causing him to be sidelined for almost two months. On 29 October, he agreed to a contract extension, tying him to the club until 2026 and increasing his buyout clause from €60 million to €80 million.

On 3 November, he scored his first two UEFA Champions League goals in a 4–0 home group stage victory against Beşiktaş, and was named man of the match. He repeated the feat three weeks later in a 3–1 win against Borussia Dortmund, ensuring the team's qualification to the round of sixteen for the first time since the 2008–09 season. In doing so, he became the second Portuguese player after Cristiano Ronaldo to score two or more in consecutive Champions League matches.

His second season would be marked by continuous injuries resulted in Gonçalves performances declining, finishing the season appearing in 31 games, scoring 14 goals and providing 7 assists, which resulted in him being the highest contributor of his team that season.

2022–23: Regained form
Gonçalves started the season by scoring in a 3–3 away draw to Braga on 7 August, followed by a brace against Rio Ave a week later. He quickly regained his form from last season, scoring three goals and providing three assists in September, despite his team poor run of form, sometimes filling as a number 8, when his teammates were sidelined with an injury.

International career

Youth
Gonçalves began his international career with under-18 level in 2016. In March 2018, he was called up to the under-20 level to play two friendlies, against the Germany and England.

He earned his first cap for Portugal at under-21 level on 4 September 2020, in a 4–0 win in Cyprus for the 2021 UEFA European Championship qualifiers. On 13 October, in another away fixture for the same competition, he scored twice against Gibraltar in a 3–0 away victory.

On 15 March 2021, Gonçalves was selected by Rui Jorge for his 2021 UEFA European Under-21 Championship squad.

Senior
Having already participated in the first stage of the under-21 finals, in May 2021 Gonçalves was selected by Fernando Santos for his UEFA Euro 2020 squad due to the delay caused by the COVID-19 pandemic. He made his full debut the following 4 June, playing the second half of the 0–0 friendly draw with Spain in Madrid. Gonçalves ended up not playing for Portugal in the Euro 2020 in an eventual round-of-16 exit.

In October 2022, he was named in Portugal's preliminary 55-man squad for the 2022 FIFA World Cup in Qatar.

Style of play
During his time with Famalicão, Gonçalves played predominantly as a central midfielder at a deeper position. Under manager Rúben Amorim at Sporting CP, Gonçalves was deployed as an attacking midfielder or a right winger in the team's 3–4–2–1 or 3–4–3 formations, during which, he is allowed the freedom to fluidly move, coming infield to get close to the central striker or pulling off to the edge of the box. Gonçalves also has good ball  control and balance, which allows him to roam around the attacking areas of the pitch. While playing as a false 9, Gonçalves contributes to the possession of his team dropping deep to pick up possession and when receiving the ball in these half-spaces, his spatial awareness allows him to reliably transfer the ball to a dangerous area of the pitch.

Career statistics

Club

International

Honours
Sporting CP
Primeira Liga: 2020–21
Taça da Liga: 2020–21, 2021–22
Supertaça Cândido de Oliveira: 2021

Individual
Primeira Liga's Best Young Player of the Year: 2019–20, 2020–21
Primeira Liga's Midfielder of the Month: June 2020, September/October 2020, November 2020, April 2021, August 2021
Primeira Liga's Player of the Month: September/October 2020, November 2020
Primeira Liga top scorer: 2020–21
Primeira Liga Team of the Year: 2020–21

References

External links

1998 births
Living people
People from Chaves, Portugal
Portuguese footballers
Association football midfielders
Wolverhampton Wanderers F.C. players
Primeira Liga players
F.C. Famalicão players
Sporting CP footballers
Portugal youth international footballers
Portugal under-21 international footballers
Portugal international footballers
UEFA Euro 2020 players
Portuguese expatriate footballers
Expatriate footballers in Spain
Expatriate footballers in England
Portuguese expatriate sportspeople in Spain
Portuguese expatriate sportspeople in England
Sportspeople from Vila Real District